Galomecalpa majestica is a species of moth of the family Tortricidae. It is found in Bolivia.

The wingspan is about 34 mm. The ground colour of the forewings is preserved in the form of whitish edges of the interfasciae. The inner parts of the interfasciae are suffused brownish and the basal and dorsal areas are brownish. The hindwings are pale brownish grey strigulated (finely streaked) darker.

Etymology
The species name refers to the facies of the species and is derived from majestica (meaning splendid).

References

Moths described in 2013
Euliini